Uwe Preißler (born 17 June 1967) is a German former cyclist. He competed in the team pursuit event at the 1988 Summer Olympics winning a silver medal.

References

External links
 

1967 births
Living people
East German male cyclists
Olympic cyclists of East Germany
Cyclists at the 1988 Summer Olympics
Medalists at the 1988 Summer Olympics
Olympic medalists in cycling
Olympic silver medalists for East Germany
People from Mühlhausen
Cyclists from Thuringia
People from Bezirk Erfurt